The Times series is a group of north London newspapers published weekly by Newsquest in the London Borough of Barnet and surroundings. The series includes the Barnet & Potters Bar Times, Edgware & Mill Hill Times and the Hendon & Finchley Times. The newspapers are mostly distributed free with a small amount sold. The total readership of the four titles as of October 2014 was 72,707.

In 2013, the Times claimed to have been banned from reporting on the matches of Barnet Football Club.

References

External links 
http://www.times-series.co.uk/
Barnet Borough Times on Twitter

Newspapers published by Newsquest
Weekly newspapers published in the United Kingdom